Ville-d’Avray is an 1865 oil painting by French artist Jean-Baptiste-Camille Corot. It is on display at the National Gallery of Art in Washington D.C.

History
In 1817, Corot's father bought a country house in Ville-d'Avray, on the outskirts of Paris, where the painting was made. Ville d'Avray became for Corot the equivalent as the Fontainebleau Forest for the Barbizon artists. Throughout his career, the artist repeatedly painted views of this place.

Description
The painting depicts the calm surface of a lake and buildings on the far shore, the figures of peasants, merged with the landscape and engaged in their usual familiar and ordinary activities. The foreground is given to one of the artist favorite motifs: trees. Most likely, these are willows, which Corot painted quite often.

Gentle pastel tones create a strange drowsy atmosphere of early morning in this landscape. The silver sky is pale, the houses are reflected in the lake, and the sun that illuminates these houses is reminiscent of the picturesque sketches created by Corot in Italy.

The depicted objects are quite prosaic, but Corot makes the landscape evoke in the viewer a feeling of peace and tranquility, while the fullness of light and air originates a sense of graceful dissolution in nature.

Provenance
The painting was donated in 1955 to the National Gallery of Art, in Washington, D.C., by Count Cecil Pecci-Blunt.

External links
Europe in the age of enlightenment and revolution, a catalog from The Metropolitan Museum of Art Libraries (fully available online as PDF), which contains material on d'Avray (see index)

1865 paintings
Landscape paintings
Paintings by Jean-Baptiste-Camille Corot
Collections of the National Gallery of Art
Water in art